Jack Hickey (13 December 1930 – 13 September 2018) is a former Australian rules footballer, who played in the Victorian Football League, (VFL).

He was 19th man for Collingwood when the Magpies was defeated by Melbourne in the 1955 Grand Final.

External links

Collingwood Forever

Australian rules footballers from Victoria (Australia)
Collingwood Football Club players
1930 births
2018 deaths